Johannes 'Hans' Steinbrenner (16 October 1905 - 12 June 1964) was a German concentration camp overseer. Born in Frankfurt am Main, he is most notable for his participation in the murder of several prisoners during the early phases of Dachau Concentration Camp. Sentenced to life imprisonment after the liberation of Dachau, he was released early in 1962 and killed himself two years later.

Bibliography
  Christopher Dillon: Dachau and the SS: A Schooling in Violence. Oxford University Press, Oxford 2015, .
  Kim Wünschmann: Before Auschwitz: Jewish Prisoners in the Prewar Concentration Camps. Harvard University Press, Harvard 2015, .
  Jörg Döring, Markus Joch (ed.s): Alfred Andersch revisited. Werkbiographische Studien im Zeichen der Sebald-Debatte. De Gruyter, Berlin 2011, .
  Klaus Drobisch, Günther Wieland: System der NS-Konzentrationslager, 1933–1939. Akademie Verlag, Berlin 1993, .
  Hans Günther Richardi: Schule der Gewalt. Das Konzentrationslager Dachau, 1995.

References

External links
 
 
 

1905 births
1964 deaths
Holocaust perpetrators
Military personnel from Frankfurt
Dachau concentration camp personnel
Buchenwald concentration camp personnel
Waffen-SS personnel
SS personnel
Nazi Party members